Turtle Lake is a lake located on Vancouver Island east of Great Central Lake.

References

 2. Turtle Lake, British Columbia

Alberni Valley
Lakes of Vancouver Island
Alberni Land District